"Windmill" is a song and a single made by the German power metal band Helloween taken from the album Chameleon. 
This single has the same b-sides as the single Step Out of Hell, and the same cover. "Windmill" was released in Europe and "Step Out of Hell" in Japan.

Background 

Weikath said about the B-sides 'Introduction' and 'Get me Out of Here': "With 'Introduction' I actually wanted to create some kind of Spinal Tappish impact like a German rock star who has lost track of reality and also I wanted to take some shit out on some people I knew. Which is more or less a private way to take it out on them, so it was basicially fun. During that time I was so unhappy with many things and I was not behind the whole Helloween thing because I thought we were going in the wrong direction, and well being in that situation I just wanted to have some fun. There's some bootleg videos you can watch from shows in Japan where I behave very odd, and still I played my stuff but it was quite obvious that I wasn't with the thing or with the game and this was merely aggression in between Michael Kiske and me with fronts being built up inside the band with different camps that made the whole time very hard for everyone. Especially for me in particular and Michael Kiske as well. Then I tended to do a lot of stupid stuff to irritate him or anyone else. and thats how the "Introduction" came about and the whole song 'Get Me Out Of Here'. Funny thing is that Michael Kiske liked 'Get Me Out Of Here' so much that he said I should always write stuff like it.....even for albums. And I said "Yeah well thats taking it a little bit to far maybe" and he said "Why?" , and I said " Cuz we simply cant do it...so lets close the subject please". I mean he may have had a point but on the other hand I'm quite happy that its on the b-side."

Single track listing

Personnel
Michael Kiske - vocals
Roland Grapow - lead and rhythm guitars
Michael Weikath - lead and rhythm guitars
Markus Grosskopf - bass guitar
Ingo Schwichtenberg - drums

References

Helloween songs
1993 singles
EMI Records singles
German hard rock songs
Folk rock songs